Matti Häyry (born 20 September 1956) is Professor of Philosophy at Aalto University School of Business in Helsinki, Finland. In 2004-2013, he was Professor of Bioethics and Philosophy of Law at the University of Manchester in England, and before that he held professorships in philosophy and moral philosophy at the universities of Central Lancashire and Kuopio.

Häyry’s main fields of interest have been moral and political philosophy and philosophical bioethics. He studied philosophy at the University of Helsinki and started focusing on medical and healthcare ethics during his postgraduate years. His practical topics in bioethics have ranged from abortion, euthanasia, and resource allocation to genetics, systems biology, and synthetic biology. Theoretically, his work has centred on the main normative doctrines of European moral and political philosophy.

Häyry is a founding member of the International Association of Bioethics and he served on its board of directors during 2001–2009, in 2007–2009 as the association’s president.

In an endeavour to express ethical ideas in an artistic format, Häyry produced in 2013 – with Tuija Takala, Corky Laing, and Lasse Väyrynen – a concept album on the ethics of genetics; Playing God – Corky Laing and the Perfct Child Perform Original Music from Test: the Rock Opera (Gonzo Multimedia 2013).

Works 

Häyry, Matti & Häyry, Heta, Rakasta, kärsi ja unhoita: Moraalifilosofisia pohdintoja ihmiselämän alusta ja lopusta. Kirjayhtymä 1987. 

Häyry, Heta & Häyry, Matti, Taide, tunne ja turmelus: Kaksi näkökulmaa R. G. Collingwoodin estetiikkaan. Helsingin yliopiston filosofian laitoksen julkaisuja 4/1989. 

Häyry, Matti, Critical studies in philosophical medical ethics. University of Helsinki 1990. 

Häyry, Matti, Liberal utilitarianism and applied ethics. Routledge 1994. 

Häyry, Heta & Häyry, Matti, Hyvä, kaunis, tosi – arvojen filosofiaa. Yliopistopaino 1997. 

Häyry, Heta & Häyry, Matti, Elämän ehdot: Bioetiikan, vapauden ja vastuun filosofiaa. Yliopistopaino 1997. 

Häyry, Matti, Ihannevaltio: Historiallinen johdatus yhteiskuntafilosofiaan. WSOY 2000. 

Häyry, Matti, Mahdollisimman monen onnellisuus: Utilitarismin historia, teoria ja sovellukset. WSOY 2001. 

Häyry, Matti, Playing God: Essays on Bioethics. Helsinki University Press 2001. 

Häyry, Matti, Hyvä elämä ja oikea käytös: Historiallinen johdatus moraalifilosofiaan. Yliopistopaino 2002. 

Häyry, Matti, Cloning, Selection, and Values: Essays on Bioethical Intuitions. Acta Philosophica Fennica 2007. 

Häyry, Matti, Rationality and the Genetic Challenge: Making People Better? Cambridge University Press 2010. 

Häyry, Matti, Ihminen 2.0: Geneettisen valikoinnin ja parantelun eettiset kysymykset. Gaudeamus 2012.

Notes 

1956 births
Anti-natalists
Finnish philosophers
Finnish skeptics
Living people
Synthetic biologists